Carlton Wayne Reeves (born April 11, 1964) is a United States district judge of the United States District Court for the Southern District of Mississippi. He is the chairman as well as a member of the United States Sentencing Commission.

Early life and education
Reeves was born in 1964 in Fort Hood, Texas, and was raised in rural Yazoo City, Mississippi. Reeves was one of seven children, with three sisters and three brothers.

Reeves was a student in the first integrated public-school class in Mississippi.  As a teenager, Reeves cleaned the office of U.S. District Judge William H. Barbour Jr., whom he would later replace on the federal bench. Reeves was the first person in his family to attend a four-year college, and graduated in 1986 magna cum laude from Jackson State University. Reeves then attended the University of Virginia School of Law, graduating in 1989 as a Ritter Scholar. After law school, Reeves served as a law clerk for Justice Reuben V. Anderson, the first African American judge to serve on the Mississippi Supreme Court.

Professional career
Reeves began his legal career in 1991 as a staff attorney for the Supreme Court of Mississippi; later that year, he entered private practice as an associate at the Jackson, Mississippi office of regional law firm Phelps Dunbar. From 1995 to 2001, Reeves served as Chief of the Civil Division for the Office of the United States Attorney for the Southern District of Mississippi. In 2001, Reeves returned to private practice to found his own firm, Pigott Reeves Johnson, in Jackson. During his time in private practice, Reeves served on the boards of a number of civic organizations, including the ACLU of Mississippi, the Mississippi Center for Justice, and the Magnolia Bar Association.

Federal judicial service
 
On April 28, 2010, Reeves was nominated by President Barack Obama to fill a seat on the United States District Court for the Southern District of Mississippi vacated by Judge William H. Barbour Jr. Reeves was confirmed by the United States Senate on December 19, 2010 by voice vote. Reeves is the second African American to serve on the federal judiciary in Mississippi. He received his commission on December 20, 2010.

Notable decisions

Campaign for Southern Equality v. Bryant

On November 25, 2014, Reeves ruled in the case of Campaign for Southern Equality v. Bryant that Mississippi’s same-sex marriage ban violated the Due Process and Equal Protection Clauses of the Fourteenth Amendment. Reeves' opinion noted the connection between racism and homophobia, and how that connection had long operated to oppress both black and LGBT Mississippians. Reeves held that, just as the state's views on race had led it to oppress blacks for generations, "Mississippi’s traditional beliefs about gay and lesbian citizens ... [took] away fundamental rights owed to every citizen. It is time to restore those rights."

United States v. Butler

On February 10, 2015, Reeves sentenced three young white men for their roles in the death of a 48-year-old black man named James Craig Anderson. They were part of a group that beat Anderson and then killed him by running over his body with a truck, yelling "white power" as they drove off. In handing down sentences of between 7 and 50 years in prison for the defendants, Reeves gave a widely publicized speech that remarked on how the killing of Anderson fit into Mississippi's "tortured past" of lynchings and racism. While noting that the defendants had "ripped off the scab of the healing scars of Mississippi," Reeves asserted that the integrated, race-neutral operation of Mississippi's modern-day justice system was "the strongest way" for the state to reject the racism of the past.

Barber v. Bryant

On June 30, 2016, Reeves issued a ruling that halted Mississippi's Religious Liberty Accommodations Act from going into effect. The Act provided protection to entities and individuals who refused to provide marriage-related goods and services to LGBT individuals. Reeves' holding noted that "[r]eligious freedom was one of the building blocks of this great nation, and after the nation was torn apart, the guarantee of equal protection under [the] law was used to stitch it back together. But [the Act] does not honor that tradition of religiou[s] freedom, nor does it respect the equal dignity of all of Mississippi's citizens. It must be enjoined."

In June 2017 a panel of judges from the United States Court of Appeals for the Fifth Circuit reversed Judge Reeves ruling in a 3-0 decision, finding that the plaintiffs lacked standing. The Religious Liberty Accommodations Act was reinstated.

Moore v. Bryant
On September 8, 2016, Reeves issued a ruling dismissing a lawsuit seeking to have the Mississippi state flag, which contains the Stars and Bars emblem of the Confederacy declared unconstitutional.  The basis of the dismissal is the plaintiff's failure to allege a specific injury and thus an inability to demonstrate the standing necessary to bring an action in federal court.

Jackson v. Currier

On November 20, 2018, Reeves issued a written ruling in Jackson Women's Health Organization v. Currier (Mary Currier in her official capacity as the State Health Officer of the State of Mississippi). The ruling struck down a Mississippi law, passed in March 2018, that outlawed most abortions after the 15th week of pregnancy. Reeves had previously issued an injunction, effectively preventing the law from taking effect. His ruling included strong statements about the law, calling it "pure gaslighting" as well as an unconstitutional limitation on women's due-process rights. His ruling also invalidated a similar Louisiana law, which had been written as contingent on the outcome of the Mississippi lawsuit.

Reeves' decision was upheld by the U.S. Court of Appeals. In October 2020, the Attorney General for Mississippi filed a brief with the U.S. Supreme Court seeking clarification of the ruling. The Court granted certiorari to the petition on May 17, 2021, limiting the case to the single question "Whether all pre-viability prohibitions on elective abortions are unconstitutional." The case is expected to be heard on December 1, 2021.

Jamison v McClendon

On August 4, 2020, Reeves wrote an opinion upholding the grant of qualified immunity in a case against a Richland, Mississippi police officer. The opinion stated that the two-hour traffic stop of Clarence Jamison by Officer Nick McClendon should have resulted in a Fourth Amendment violation, but he was limited to uphold prior decisions by the US Supreme Court.  Reeves' ruling gives a history of minority deaths that have occurred over the decades, and argues that the doctrine of qualified immunity must be done away with. Austin Sarat, writing in Justia, compares Reeves' opinion to "great dissents written by Supreme Court justices". CNN quotes a portion of the opinion:

Current cases
Governor Phil Bryant signed a law scheduled to go into effect on July 1, 2019, that would ban abortions later than six weeks of pregnancy.  The Center for Reproductive Rights in Jackson, Mississippi challenged the law. Because of his decision finding the prior, less restrictive, "15-week" law in the Currier case to be unconstitutional, Reeves began his decision by writing, "Here we go again. Mississippi has passed another law banning abortions prior to viability." He inquired, "Doesn't it boil down to six is less than fifteen?", adding that the new law "smacks of defiance to this court." Reeves noted that although there were exceptions for situations where the mother's life or health is endangered should pregnancy be taken to term, the law does not allow for exceptions in the cases of pregnancies resulting from rape or incest.

Nomination to United States Sentencing Commission 

On May 11, 2022, President Joe Biden announced his intent to nominate Reeves to serve as a member of the United States Sentencing Commission. On May 12, 2022, his nomination was sent to the Senate, he has been nominated to fill the position and chairmanship left vacant by Judge Patti B. Saris, whose term expired. On June 8, 2022, a hearing on his nomination was held before the Senate Judiciary Committee. On July 21, 2022, his nomination was reported out of committee by a voice vote, with 6 Republican senators voting “no” on record. On August 4, 2022, the United States Senate confirmed his nomination by a voice vote.

See also 
 List of African-American federal judges
 List of African-American jurists

References

External links

"A Black Mississippi Judge's Breathtaking Speech To 3 White Murderers", February 13, 2015, NPR

1964 births
Living people
21st-century American judges
African-American judges
Assistant United States Attorneys
Chairpersons of the United States Sentencing Commission
Jackson State University alumni
Judges of the United States District Court for the Southern District of Mississippi
Lawyers from Jackson, Mississippi
United States district court judges appointed by Barack Obama
University of Virginia School of Law alumni